Mikhail Grigorievich Zemtsov (1688 – 1743) was a Russian Imperial architect who practiced a sober, restrained Petrine Baroque style, which he learned from his peer Domenico Trezzini. He has been described as "the first professionally trained Russian architect in history".

Career 
Peter the Great put Zemtsov in charge of implementing designs by foreign architects such as Trezzini (in whose house Zemtsov took up residence) and Niccolo Michetti (also serving as interpreter for him). In 1723 he travelled to Stockholm in order to hire the most highly skilled masons for the tsar.

During the early part of his career, Zemtsov participated in designing the Summer Garden in St Petersburg and the park in Peterhof Palace. The other project in which he was involved was the design of Catherinethal palace and park in Reval (1718–25). His Italian Palace on the Fontanka Embankment (1726–28) was demolished, and his Anichkov Palace (1741–50) was later rebuilt. 

Zemtsov was appointed one of the principal architects of the Russian capital in 1737, working on the Transfiguration Cathedral in St. Petersburg along with Pietro Antonio Trezzini. He completed his work on the Russian Building Code two years before his death.

References

External links 
 

1688 births
1743 deaths
Architects from the Russian Empire
Russian Baroque architects